The 2011 Pac-12 Conference football season began on September 1, 2011 with Montana State at Utah and UC Davis at Arizona State. The conference's first game was played on September 10 with Utah at USC, and the final game played was the Pac-12 Championship Game on Friday, December 2.  Oregon defeated UCLA to claim their third straight conference title. This is the first season for the conference as a 12-team league. In July 2011, Colorado and Utah joined the conference, at which time the league's name changed from the Pacific-10 Conference.

Seven teams accepted bowl bids, an improvement from four the previous season. The BCS bowls featured  Oregon in the Rose Bowl against Big Ten champion Wisconsin and Stanford facing Big 12 champion Oklahoma State in the Fiesta Bowl. The Ducks claimed their first Rose Bowl victory since 1917, while the Cardinal fell to the Cowboys in overtime. Of the non-BCS bowl participants, only Utah won their matchup against Georgia Tech in the Sun Bowl.

Four teams changed head coaches. Arizona head coach Mike Stoops was fired midseason, while UCLA's Rick Neuheisel, Arizona State's Dennis Erickson, and Washington State's Paul Wulff were let go at the end of the season.

Previous season
Oregon repeated as the conference champion, ending the regular season with a program-first twelve wins and with a #2 BCS ranking. The Ducks earned a berth in the 2011 BCS National Championship Game, which they lost to SEC Champion Auburn. Stanford repeated as the conference runner-up, ending the regular season with a program-first eleven wins (their sole loss was to Oregon) and with a #4 BCS ranking, giving them an at-large BCS berth.  The Cardinal defeated ACC Champion Virginia Tech in the 2011 Orange Bowl.  Arizona lost to Oklahoma State while Washington defeated Nebraska in non-BCS bowls.

Preseason
2011 Pac-12 Spring Football:

North Division 	
 California, Tue., March 15 – Sun., April 24
 Oregon, Mon., March 28 – Sat., April 30
 Oregon State, Mon., March 28 – Sat., April 30
 Stanford, Mon., Feb. 21 – Sat., April 9 	
 Washington, Tue., March 29 – Sat., April 30 	
 Washington State, Mon., March 7 – Sat., April 16
	  
South Division 	
 Arizona, Mon., March 21 – Sat., April 16 	
 Arizona State, Tue., March 22 – Sat., April 23
 Colorado, Fri., March 11 – Sat., April 9 	
 UCLA, Thu., March 31 – Sat., April 23 	
 USC, Tue., March 22 – Sat., April 16 	
 Utah, Tue., March 8 – Sat., April 16

Head coaches

 Mike Stoops (first six games)/Tim Kish (last six games), Arizona
 Dennis Erickson, Arizona State
 Jeff Tedford, California – 5th year
 Jon Embree, Colorado – 1st year
 Chip Kelly, Oregon – 3rd year
 Mike Riley, Oregon State – 10th year

 David Shaw, Stanford – 1st year
 Rick Neuheisel (regular season and Pac-12 Championship Game – 4th year/Mike Johnson (Kraft Fight Hunger Bowl), UCLA 
 Lane Kiffin, USC – 2nd year
 Kyle Whittingham, Utah – 7th year
 Steve Sarkisian, Washington – 3rd year
 Paul Wulff, Washington State – 4th year

David Shaw took over as head coach of the Stanford Cardinal after Jim Harbaugh was hired as head coach of the NFL's San Francisco 49ers.
Mike Stoops was fired as head coach of the Arizona Wildcats on October 10 after starting the season 1–5 (their sole victory was against FCS Northern Arizona). Including the previous season, the Wildcats under Stoops had lost 10 consecutive games against FBS opponents, with their last victory over a FBS team taking place nearly a year earlier on October 30, 2010 against UCLA. They had then lost their final four games and the Alamo Bowl. Defensive Coordinator Tim Kish was named interim head coach for the remainder of the season.  Former Michigan head coach Rich Rodriguez was named the new head coach on November 22.
Rick Neuheisel was fired as head coach of the UCLA Bruins on November 28, but coached his final game in the inaugural Pac-12 Championship Game on December 2.  Offensive coordinator Mike Johnson will coach the Bruins in the Kraft Fight Hunger Bowl. On December 10, 2011, Jim L. Mora was named new head coach of the Bruins.
Arizona State announced on November 28 that Dennis Erickson will not return the following year as head coach, but will coach the Sun Devils in their bowl game. Former Pittsburgh head coach Todd Graham was announced as Erickson's successor on December 14.
Paul Wulff was fired as the head coach of the Washington State Cougars on November 29. He was succeeded by former Texas Tech head coach Mike Leach on November 30.

Rankings

Schedule

Week one

Week two

Week three

Week four

Week five

Week six

Week seven

Week eight

Week nine

Week ten

Week eleven

Week twelve

Week thirteen

Week fourteen (Pac-12 Championship Game)

Pac-12 vs. BCS matchups

Bowl games
Pac-12 teams played in the following bowl games. Pac-12 teams are bolded.

Players of the week
Following each week of games, Pac-12 conference officials selected the players of the week from the conference's teams.

Position key

Home attendance

Due to reconstruction at California Memorial Stadium, California played their 2011 home games in AT&T Park in San Francisco, California.
Washington official home game played versus Washington State in Seattle, WA at CenturyLink Field (capacity 67,000) as renovation began on Husky Stadium.
This was an official Washington State home game played versus Oregon State at CenturyLink Field.

Notes

 May 26, 2011 – The NCAA upheld all findings and penalties against USC in their infractions case on former players Reggie Bush and O. J. Mayo. The USC football team will not participate in the Pac-12 Football Championship Game or a bowl game.
 July 18, 2011 – USC running back Marc Tyler was suspended for the season opener against Minnesota for making inappropriate comments to the media.
 July 27, 2011 – Media Day in Los Angeles.
November 30, 2011 - Stanford defensive assistant Chester McGlockton, who had been on the coaching staff for the past two seasons, died suddenly in his sleep.
November 30, 2011 - The NCAA granted UCLA a waiver to still be bowl-eligible in the event of a loss in the Pac-12 title game to finish at 6-7.  UCLA subsequently accepted a bid to participate in the Kraft Fight Hunger Bowl.
December 5, 2011 - Oregon cornerback Cliff Harris was dismissed from the team for violating team rules.  He had already been suspended from the team indefinitely following a traffic stop on October 24 and only played in six games during the season.
December 10, 2011 - Stanford quarterback Andrew Luck becomes the fourth player to be a runner up for the Heisman Trophy in  consecutive seasons and the first since Arkansas running back Darren McFadden in 2006 and 2007.  In 2010, the award was won by Auburn quarterback Cam Newton and this year it was won by Baylor quarterback Robert Griffin III.   This was the third year in a row that Stanford has had a runner-up for the Heisman (running back Toby Gerhart was the runner up in 2009).
December 31, 2011 - Washington fires defensive coordinator Nick Holt, linebackers coach Mike Cox, and safeties coach Jeff Mills after the Huskies give up the most yards in school history in a 67-56 loss to Baylor in the Alamo Bowl.
January 2, 2012 - Oregon defeats Wisconsin in the Rose Bowl for their first Rose Bowl victory since 1917, setting a record for most total points scored with 83. Stanford falls to Oklahoma State in the Fiesta Bowl in overtime, giving the Cowboys their first BCS bowl victory.

Awards and honors
Johnny Unitas Golden Arm Award
Andrew Luck, QB, Stanford

Maxwell Award
Andrew Luck, QB, Stanford

Walter Camp Player of the Year Award
Andrew Luck, QB, Stanford

All-Americans
Academic All-America Team Member of the Year (CoSIDA)
Andrew Luck, QB, Stanford

AFCA Coaches' All-Americans First Team:
OL David DeCastro, Stanford
QB Andrew Luck, Stanford
AP LaMichael James, Oregon

All-Pac-12 teams
Offensive Player of the Year: Andrew Luck, QB, Stanford
Pat Tillman Defensive Player of the Year: Mychal Kendricks, LB, California
Co-Offensive Freshman of the Year: Marqise Lee, WR, USC and De'Anthony Thomas, RB, Oregon
Defensive Freshman of the Year: Dion Bailey, LB, USC
Coach of the Year: David Shaw, Stanford

First Team:

ST=special teams player (not a kicker or returner)

All-Academic
First team

2012 NFL Draft

References